Empire School may refer to:

Empire School (Rupert, Idaho), listed on the National Register of Historic Places in Minidoka County, Idaho
Empire School (Empire, Michigan), listed on the National Register of Historic Places in Leelanau County, Michigan